The following is a discography listing of Gilbert O'Sullivan's officially released works to date.

Albums

Compilation albums

EPs

Singles

† Duet with Peggy Lee

Notes

References

 
Discographies of Irish artists
Discographies of British artists
Pop music discographies